Ponniyin Selvan is a 2005 Indian Tamil-language drama film written and directed by Radha Mohan. Produced by A. M. Ratnam, it stars his son Ravi Krishna, along with Gopika and Revathi, while Vidyasagar had composed the music for the film. The film is unrelated to the same-titled novel by Kalki Krishnamurthy. It was released in Telugu as Muddhula Koduku and additionally featured Uttej and Venu Madhav replacing the Tamil actors Elango Kumaravel and Mayilsamy, respectively.

Plot
Venu is a middle-class young man who lives in a middle-class area. His life revolves around his mother, sister, neighbor and friends. He has an inferiority complex because of the scar on his face. One fateful day, Venu decides to have plastic surgery to remove the scar. In order to raise money for his operation, he takes up part-time jobs. He becomes harsh and cold and starts to behave strangely with his family and friends. This new Venu shocks everyone around him. The rest of the story is about what he realizes in the process of getting his new face job.

Cast

 Ravi Krishna as Venu
 Gopika as Kani
 Prakash Raj as Guru
 Revathi as Ponni
 Sanjeeda Sheikh as Priya
 Thalaivasal Vijay as Drawing Artist
 Devadarshini as Venu's sister
 Jagan as Jaga
 Elango Kumaravel as Pandiya
 Mayilsamy as Garbage company worker
 Balaji as Beggar
 Mumaith Khan in an item number

Soundtrack

References

External links
 
 

2005 films
2000s Tamil-language films
Films scored by Vidyasagar
Indian drama films
2005 drama films
Films directed by Radha Mohan